Council Grove State Park (Salish: Člmé, "Tree Limb Cut Off," also Ncx̣͏ʷotew̓s) is a history-oriented, public recreation area located  northwest of Missoula in Missoula County, Montana. The site of the park hosted the signing on July 16, 1855, of the Hellgate treaty between representatives of the United States government and members of the Bitterroot Salish, Pend d'Oreille, and the Kootenai to create the Flathead Indian Reservation. A monument commemorates the signing. Natural features found in the park are its large, old-growth ponderosa pines, grassy fields, and cottonwood stand by the Clark Fork River. Its recreational features include hiking and fishing.

References

External links
Council Grove State Park Montana Fish, Wildlife & Parks
Council Grove State Park Trail Map Montana Fish, Wildlife & Parks

Protected areas of Missoula County, Montana
State parks of Montana
Protected areas established in 1978
1978 establishments in Montana